Knetemann is a surname. Notable people with the surname include:

Gerrie Knetemann (1951–2004), Dutch cyclist 
Roxane Knetemann (born 1987), Dutch cyclist